Charles Omondi Korea Owuor (born in Kenya) is a former Kenyan international goalkeeper now serving as the keeper trainer at Kenyan Premier League side KCB.

Career
He joined KCB as keeper trainer in July 2019 from Bidco United. He previously served Gor Mahia F.C., Tusker F.C., Sony Sugar F.C. and Nairobi City Stars in the same capacity.

Omondi briefly held forte as coach at Nairobi City Stars for four months from June 2013 after the departure of Gambian Bai Malleh Wadda. 

Omondi was a goalkeeper at Gor Mahia F.C., Kisumu Posta and Kenya.

References

1968 births
Living people
Football managers in Kenya
Gor Mahia F.C. players
Kenyan Premier League players
Kenyan football managers